The 2020–21 Minnesota Golden Gophers women's basketball team represented the University of Minnesota during the 2020–21 NCAA Division I women's basketball season. The Golden Gophers, led by third-year head coach Lindsay Whalen, played their home games at Williams Arena and were members of the Big Ten Conference.

The Golden Gophers finished the season 8–13 and 7–11 in Big Ten play to finish in tenth place.  As the ninth seed in the Big Ten tournament, they were defeated by Nebraska in the Second Round.  They were not invited to the NCAA tournament or the WNIT.

Previous season
The Golden Gophers finished the season 16–15 and 5–12 in Big Ten play to finish in eleventh place.  As the eleven seed in the Big Ten tournament, they defeated Penn State in the First Round, before falling to Ohio State in the Second Round.  The NCAA tournament and WNIT were cancelled due to the COVID-19 outbreak.

Roster

Schedule and results

Source

|-
! colspan=6 style=| Non-conference regular season

|-
! colspan=6 style=|Big Ten Conference season

|-
! colspan=6 style=|Big Ten Women's Tournament

Rankings

The Coaches Poll did not release a Week 2 poll and the AP Poll did not release a poll after the NCAA Tournament.

See also
2020–21 Minnesota Golden Gophers men's basketball team

References

Minnesota Golden Gophers women's basketball seasons
Minnesota
Minnesota Golden Gophers women's basketball team
Minnesota Golden Gophers women's basketball team